ATN Zoom is a Canadian Category B Hindi language specialty channel owned by Asian Television Network (ATN). It broadcasts programming from Zoom as well as Canadian content.

ATN Zoom is an Indian entertainment channel whose sole focus is Bollywood and the Indian entertainment industry.  It features entertainment news, interviews with the top stars, movie reviews, music and more.

External links
 
 Zoom

Digital cable television networks in Canada
Television channels and stations established in 2011
Hindi-language television in Canada